Wigelbeyer is a surname. Notable people with the surname include:

 Christoph Wigelbeyer (born 1973), Austrian choir director, conductor, singer and music educator
 Viktor Wigelbeyer (1897–1969), Austrian bobsledder

German-language surnames